Mexico–United Arab Emirates relations are the diplomatic relations between Mexico and the United Arab Emirates. Both nations are members of the United Nations.

History 

Mexico and the United Arab Emirates (UAE) established diplomatic relations on 12 September 1975. For the first three decades, Mexico was accredited to the UAE from its embassy in Beirut, Lebanon while the UAE was accredited to Mexico from its embassy in Washington, D.C., United States. In 2008, Mexico opened a consulate-general in Dubai to promote trade and cultural cooperation between the two nations. In 2010, the UAE opened an embassy in Mexico City and in return, Mexico opened an embassy in Abu Dhabi in 2012 and closed its consulate in Dubai.

Since the establishment of resident diplomatic missions, both nations have increased mutual international cooperation, cultural events, trade and high level visits. Foreign ministers of both nations have repeatedly visited each other's nation and have signed several bilateral agreements including improved cooperation in the energy sector. In 2012 both nations signed an agreement to avoid double taxation on income and are currently in talks to lift visa requirements on diplomatic and official passport holders from government officials of both nations. In 2012, there were over 3,000 Mexican citizens living and working in the UAE, mostly in the energy (petrol) sector and more than 50,000 Mexican citizens visit the country for tourism annually.

In April 2014, Emirati Vice President and Prime Minister Mohammed bin Rashid Al Maktoum paid an official visit to Mexico. It was the first visit ever by a ruling Emirati Prime Minister. In January 2016 Mexican President Enrique Peña Nieto paid an official visit to the UAE. During President Peña Nieto's visit, both nations signed 13 agreements and memorandums. Both nations continue to strengthen bilateral relations and trade.

In March 2022, Mexican Foreign Minister Marcelo Ebrard paid a visit to Abu Dhabi where he held bilateral, cultural and trade discussions and promoted investment opportunities in Mexico. Ebrard would later travel to Dubai and attend the World Government Summit.

High-level visits
High-level visits from Mexico to the United Arab Emirates
 Foreign Undersecretary Lourdes Aranda (2007)
 Foreign Minister Patricia Espinosa Cantellano (2010)
 Foreign Minister José Antonio Meade (2014)
 Foreign Undersecretary Carlos de Icaza (2014)
 President Enrique Peña Nieto (2016)
 Foreign Undersecretary Martha Delgado Peralta (2019)
 Foreign Minister Marcelo Ebrard (2022)

High-level visits from the United Arab Emirates to Mexico
 Foreign Minister Abdullah bin Zayed Al Nahyan (2009, 2010, 2019)
 Vice President and Prime Minister Mohammed bin Rashid Al Maktoum (2014)

Bilateral agreements
Both nations have signed several bilateral agreements such as an Agreement on the Avoidance of Double-Taxation and Tax Evasion (2012); Memorandum of Understanding for the Establishment of Political Consultations on Issues of Mutual Interest (2012); Agreement on the Promotion and Protection of Investments (2016); Agreement on Tourism Cooperation (2016); Memorandum of Understanding of Cooperation in Clean Energy (2016); Memorandum of Understanding of Cooperation in the Energy Sector (2016); Memorandum of Understanding of Cultural Cooperation (2016); Memorandum of Understanding in Educational and Scientific Cooperation (2016); Memorandum of Understanding of Cooperation between Pemex and the Abu Dhabi National Oil Company (2016) and a Memorandum of Understanding between the Bank for Foreign Trade of Mexico (Bancomext) and the Dubai Economic Council (2016).

Transportation
There are direct flights between Dubai and Mexico City with Emirates airlines.

Trade relations 
In 2018, two-way trade between both nations totaled US$877 million. The UAE is Mexico's third biggest trading partner in the Middle East. Mexico's main exports to the UAE include: gold, vehicles and refrigerators. The UAE's main exports to Mexico include: aluminum alloy and mining equipment. Mexican multinational companies Best Ground, Cemex and KidZania operate in the UAE.

Resident diplomatic missions 
 Mexico has an embassy in Abu Dhabi
 United Arab Emirates has an embassy in Mexico City.

See also  
 Foreign relations of Mexico 
 Foreign relations of the United Arab Emirates
 Expatriates in the United Arab Emirates

References 

 
United Arab Emirates
Bilateral relations of the United Arab Emirates